Donald Chris James (born October 4, 1962) is an American former professional baseball utility player, who played in Major League Baseball (MLB) 10 years (–), for eight teams: the National League (NL) Philadelphia Phillies, San Diego Padres, San Francisco Giants, and Houston Astros; and the American League (AL) Cleveland Indians, Texas Rangers, Kansas City Royals, and Boston Red Sox. Over the course of James’ MLB career, he played first base, third base, outfield, and designated hitter.

Early life
James graduated from Stratford High School, in 1981. James is the brother of former SMU and New England Patriots running back Craig James, who appeared on television for ABC, ESPN, and CBS, as a college football analyst, after his NFL career ended.

Career
On May 4, 1991, while playing for the Indians, James had 9 runs batted in (RBI) in a 20 to 6 win over the Oakland Athletics, thereby setting that franchise’s single-game RBI record.

In 946 games over 10 seasons, James posted a .261 batting average (794-for-3040) with 343 runs, 90 home runs, 386 RBI and 193 bases on balls. Defensively, he finished his career with an overall .982 fielding percentage.

References

External links

Chris James at Baseball Almanac
Chris James at Astros Daily

Living people
1962 births
Major League Baseball outfielders
Reading Phillies players
Portland Beavers players
Philadelphia Phillies players
San Diego Padres players
San Francisco Giants players
Houston Astros players
Cleveland Indians players
Texas Rangers players
Kansas City Royals players
Boston Red Sox players
Major League Baseball left fielders
Major League Baseball right fielders
Baseball players from Texas
People from Rusk, Texas
Omaha Royals players
Maine Guides players
Spartanburg Spinners players
Bend Phillies players